Mar Gregory Karotemprel (born 1933) is an East Syriac Catholic bishop and theologian. He is Bishop Emeritus of the Syro-Malabar Catholic Eparchy of Rajkot.

Life

Mar Gregory Karotemprel was born on 6 May 1933 at Chemmalamattam in Kottayam district. He joined the Carmelites of Mary Immaculate congregation and made his first profession on 8 December 1955 at Mannanam. He did his philosophical and theological studies at Dharmaram Vidya Kshethram, Bangalore. He was ordained priest on 17 May 1963. He was elected as the Provincial of the S.H. Province of the CMI congregation in 1978. While serving as the Provincial, he was appointed as the bishop of Rajkot. His consecration and installation as bishop took place on 24 April 1983.

See also
 Syro-Malabar Eparchy of Palai

References

1933 births
Living people
Syro-Malabar bishops
People from Kottayam district
Christian clergy from Kottayam